Banda railway station is a grade A railway station in Banda district, Uttar Pradesh. Free rail wire Wifi by Railtel is available at this station. The station is equipped with IP Based CCTV camera. Its code is BNDA. It serves Banda town.

Infrastructure
The station consists of three platforms. Wi-fi is available in the station.  The station is a Category A station of Jhansi railway division of the North Central Railway zone.

References

External links

Railway stations in Banda district, India
Jhansi railway division
Banda, Uttar Pradesh